Gem Smashers, known in Japan as , is a puzzle video game developed in Italy by Frame Studios and published by Metro3D, Inc. for the Game Boy Advance. The game was released in North America on July 1, 2003, and in Japan on November 21, 2003.

Gem Smashers was originally announced in 2002 under the working title "Bau Bam Bom", named after the three playable characters. The game was ported to Wii and Nintendo 3DS on November 8, 2011, on iOS on November 15, 2012, on PlayStation 4 and PlayStation Vita on March 3, 2017, on Nintendo Switch on March 15, 2018, and on Xbox One on November 2, 2018.

Development
The game was developed by three people.

Reception
The game received mostly positive reviews. IGN noted that the game was "one of the most original puzzle games on the GBA so far."

References

2003 video games
Crave Entertainment games
Puzzle video games
Video games developed in Italy
Multiplayer and single-player video games
Game Boy Advance games
IOS games
Nintendo 3DS games
PlayStation Vita games
PlayStation 4 games
Nintendo Switch games
Xbox One games
Wii games
Metro3D games